Shurghestan (also Romanized as Shūrghestān and Shūreghestān; also known as Shūreqestān and Shūrgistān) is a village in Karkas Rural District, in the Central District of Natanz County, Isfahan Province, Iran. At the 2006 census, its population was 15, in 4 families.

References 

Populated places in Natanz County